The 43rd Assembly district of New York is one of the 150 districts in the New York State Assembly. It is currently represented by Democrat Brian Cunningham since 2022.

Leadership
The 43rd State Assembly district of New York is currently represented by Brian Cunningham, following a special election in 2022.  He succeeded Assemblywoman Diana Richardson, following her appointment as Brooklyn Deputy Borough President. Richardson was the first candidate to be elected in 2015 on the Working Families Party line. Following that election, her election victories have been on the Democratic Party line.

Geography 
The 43rd district is in Brooklyn, comprising the neighborhoods of Prospect Lefferts Gardens and Crown Heights.

Recent election results

2022

2022 special

2020

2018

2016

2015 special

2014

2012

2010

References 

Politics of Brooklyn
43